The 2012 event was the seventh edition of Los Premios 40 Principales, created by Los 40 Principales to honor the best in Spanish and international music. For the first time, Los Premios 40 Principales América was run as a separate event.

Performers

Awards

Best Song
Efecto Pasillo — "Pan y Mantequilla"
Jose de Rico (featuring Henry Mendez) — "Rayos de sol"
Alejandro Sanz — "Se Vende"
Pablo Alborán — "Te He Echado de Menos"
Juan Magan (featuring Belinda) — "Te Voy a Esperar"

Best Video
Carlos Jean — "BlackStar"
La Oreja de Van Gogh — "Cometas Por El Cielo"
Macaco — "Love Is The Only Way"
Alejandro Sanz — "No Me Compares"
Pablo Alborán — "Te He Echado de Menos"

Best Album
Estopa — Estopa 2.0
Macaco — El Murmullo del Fuego
Pablo Alborán — En Acústico
Auryn — Endless Road, 7058 (Upcoming)
Alejandro Sanz — La Música No Se Toca

Best Act
Alejandro Sanz
Estopa
Macaco
Melendi
Pablo Alborán

Best New Act
Auryn
Chila Lynn
Efecto Pasillo
Lagarto Amarillo
Xuso Jones

Best Tour
Carlos Jean — Live Experience Tour 2012
Estopa — Estopa: Tour 2.0
La Oreja de Van Gogh — Tour 2012
Maldita Nerea — Gira Mucho + Fácil
Melendi — Tour 2012

Best Latin Song
Crossfire — "Lady"
Cali & El Dandee (featuring David Bisbal) — "No Hay 2 Sin 3 (Gol)"
Tacabro — "Tacata'"
Sie7e — "Tengo Tu Love"
Cali & El Dandee — "Yo Te Esperaré"

Best Latin Act
Cali & El Dandee
Jennifer Lopez
Juanes
Pitbull
Shakira

Best International Song
Loreen — "Euphoria"
Carly Rae Jepsen — "Call Me Maybe"
Maroon 5 (featuring Christina Aguilera) — "Moves like Jagger"
Gotye (featuring Kimbra) — "Somebody That I Used to Know"
Adele — "Someone like You"

Best International Album
Coldplay — Mylo Xyloto
David Guetta — Nothing but the Beat 2.0
Maroon 5 — Overexposed
Rihanna — Talk That Talk
Flo Rida — Wild Ones

Best International Act
Alicia Keys
David Guetta
Flo Rida
Maroon 5
Taylor Swift

Best International New Act
Carly Rae Jepsen
Fun
Gotye
Nicki Minaj
One Direction

Special Awards
 Best 21st Century's Spanish Artist: Alejandro Sanz
 Best last decade's American singer-songwriter : Alicia Keys
 Most influential artist and producer of the Latin World: Pitbull

Premios 40 Principales America
Los Premios 40 Principales América is Latin American version of Los Premios 40 Principales. The first edition for awards show was held on November 30, 2012 in Veracruz, Mexico.

Best Song
Jesse & Joy — "¡Corre!"
Cali & El Dandee — "Yo Te Esperaré"
Alejandro Sanz — "No Me Compares"
Daddy Yankee — "Lovumba"
J Alvarez — "La Pregunta"

Best Album
Juanes — Juanes MTV Unplugged
Wisin & Yandel — Líderes
Daddy Yankee — Prestige
Jesse & Joy — ¿Con Quién Se Queda El Perro?
Zoé — MTV Unplugged/Música de Fondo

Best Pop Act
Reik
Tan Biónica
El Tambor de la Tribu
Jesse & Joy
Shakira

Best Urban Act
Wisin & Yandel
Daddy Yankee
Don Omar
Cali & El Dandee
Pitbull

Best North Act
León Larregui
Vazquez Sounds
Eme 15
Enjambre
Río Roma

Best Central Act
Iván Barrios
Percance
El Tambor de la Tribu
Gánster
Ale Fernández y la Suite Estéreo

Best South Act
Tan Biónica
Cali & El Dandee
Denise Rosenthal
Buxxi
Maluma

Best International Song
Michel Teló — "Ai Se Eu Te Pego"
Maroon 5 (featuring Wiz Khalifa) — "Payphone"
Gotye (featuring Kimbra) — "Somebody That I Used to Know"
Rihanna — "Where Have You Been"
Carly Rae Jepsen — "Call Me Maybe"

Best International Act
One Direction
Maroon 5
Rihanna
Katy Perry
Adele

Best International New Act
One Direction
Gotye
Michel Teló
Carly Rae Jepsen
Calvin Harris

Best International Dance Act
David Guetta
Calvin Harris
Avicii
Flo Rida
 LMFAO

References

2012 music awards
Spanish music awards
2012 in Spanish music
Los Premios 40 Principales